= Edward O. Frantz =

Edward O. Frantz, also known as Ted Frantz, is an American professor of history and an author. He wrote a book about Republican Party presidential campaigns in the American South from 1877 to 1933, and articles on other subjects of American history.

Frantz was born in Columbus, Ohio and grew up there. He graduated from Princeton University with an A.B and received M.A. and Ph.D. degrees from the University of Wisconsin. He and his family live in Indianapolis, Indiana.

== Writings ==
- The Door of Hope: Republican Presidents and the First Southern Strategy, 1877–1933 New Perspectives on the History of the South, University Press of Florida, Gainesville (2011)
- A Companion to the Reconstruction Presidents, 1865–1881
- A March of Triumph? Benjamin Harrison's Southern Tour and the Limits of Racial and Regional Reconciliation
